István Kocsis (6 October 1949 – 9 June 1994) was a Hungarian football player who participated in the 1978 World Cup in which Hungary was eliminated in the first round. His nicknames were Sandor and Pischta.

From 1975 to 1981, he played for Budapest Honvéd FC before moving to Belgium where he played for Lierse SK for two seasons (66 games), after which he decided to return to Hungary to play for FC Sopron, before ending his career in a lower-class Austrian team.

He died of cancer at the age of 44.

References

External links

FIFA Official Website
Magyar Version of Wikipedia

1949 births
1994 deaths
Hungarian footballers
Budapest Honvéd FC players
Lierse S.K. players
Hungary international footballers
Expatriate footballers in Belgium
1978 FIFA World Cup players
Association football defenders
People from Csorna
Deaths from cancer in Hungary
Sportspeople from Győr-Moson-Sopron County